The San Zeno Altarpiece is a triptych by the Italian Renaissance painter Andrea Mantegna, from c. 1457–1460. It is located in the Basilica di San Zeno, the main church of Verona. The three predellas,  stripped by the French in 1797 along with the main picture (restored to Verona in 1815), have been replaced by copies. The originals are in the Louvre (Crucifixion) and in the Musée des Beaux-Arts in Tours (Resurrection and Agony in the Garden).

The work was commissioned by the Abbot Gregorio Correr. In the centre is the Madonna enthroned with the Child, portrayed according to the Byzantine iconography of the Victorious Madonna and surrounded by chanting angels. Eight saints are placed at the sides, according to the commissioner's preferences: on the left are Peter, Paul, John the Evangelist and Zeno; on the right, Benedict, Lawrence, Gregory and John the Baptist.

The entire composition is full of detail referring to classical antiquity: the frieze with the angels which holds two garlands, or the throne which reminds the viewer of a sarcophagus. The frame, probably designed by Mantegna himself, is the original one.

It was probably the first good example of Renaissance art in Verona. It served as a model for other painters including Girolamo dai Libri.

Predella

References

External links

 Page at artonline.it

Paintings by Andrea Mantegna
1450s paintings
Paintings of Benedict of Nursia
Tourist attractions in Verona
Paintings of the Madonna and Child
Paintings depicting John the Baptist
Paintings depicting Paul the Apostle
Angels in art
Paintings in Verona
Triptychs
Paintings depicting Saint Peter
Paintings of Pope Gregory I